Institución Atlética Potencia is an Uruguayan football club from the neighbourhood of La Teja, Montevideo. It was founded on February 13, 2001 and currently plays on the Uruguayan Segunda División Profesional, second tier of their football leagues system.

Current squad

References 
http://www.iapotencia.com/
https://web.archive.org/web/20151010093123/http://www.auf.org.uy/Portal/HOME/

Football clubs in Uruguay
Association football clubs established in 2001